Soundings is an orchestral composition by the American composer Elliott Carter.  The work was commissioned by the Chicago Symphony Orchestra for their final season with the conductor Daniel Barenboim as music director.  It was first performed on October 6, 2005 at the Symphony Center, Chicago, by Barenboim and the Chicago Symphony Orchestra.

Composition
Soundings has a duration of roughly ten minutes and is composed in one continuous movement.  Carter wrote in the score program note, "Soundings celebrates the conductor/pianist Daniel Barenboim, whose Chicago Symphony Orchestra commissioned this score which was written in New York City in 2005.  It presents a 'soundings' of the conductor/pianist and of many instrumental groups or soloists within the orchestra and presents them with good humor."

Instrumentation
The work is scored for an orchestra comprising piccolo, two flutes (doubling piccolo), two oboes, cor anglais, two clarinets (first doubling E-flat clarinet, second doubling bass clarinet), contrabass clarinet, two bassoons, contrabassoon, four horns, three trumpets, three trombones, tuba, timpani, two percussionists, piano, and strings.

Reception
Reviewing the world premiere, John von Rhein of the Chicago Tribune lauded the composition, writing:
Andrew Clements of The Guardian gave the work a more mixed response, however, observing, "Composed three years ago as a leaving present for Daniel Barenboim when he stepped down as music director of the Chicago Symphony, Soundings was expressly designed for Barenboim to conduct from the piano like a Mozart concerto. For that reason, it is an odd piece, with little dialogue between the piano and the large orchestra."  He added, "The main body of the piece is a miniature concerto for the orchestra alone, with some typically nimble late Carter ideas - for a choir of clarinets and a trio of piccolos, especially - but the whole thing never really hangs together."

References

Compositions by Elliott Carter
2005 compositions
Compositions for piano and orchestra
Music commissioned by the Chicago Symphony Orchestra